Leo Winters (November 7, 1922 – March 5, 2005) was the ninth lieutenant governor of Oklahoma and the 11th State treasurer for the U.S. state of Oklahoma. Winters, a member of the Democratic Party, served alongside Oklahoma's first Republican governor, Henry Bellmon.

Early life
Winters was born November 7, 1922, in Hooker, Oklahoma, to David and Gertrude Winter, who were German immigrants from the Ukraine. Winters attended Panhandle State University, but left college to join the United States Army Air Corps. After serving in World War II as a B-17 and B-29 pilot and a total of 5 years of active duty service, he returned to Panhandle State University and earned a bachelor's degree. He earned a law degree from the University of Oklahoma School of Law in 1957.

Political career
Winters began his political career as Secretary of the Oklahoma State Election Board from 1955 through 1963. He served as an alternate delegate to the Democratic National Convention in 1956. He was elected lieutenant governor on November 6, 1962, after beating former US Representative Wilburn Cartwright in the primary with 63% and defeating Republican Dale J. Briggs in the general election with 54%. He served alongside Oklahoma's first Republican governor, Henry Bellmon.

In 1966, Winters successfully campaigned to become state treasurer.

Later life and death
Winters died Saturday, March 5, 2005, in Oklahoma City at the age of 82.

References

1922 births
2005 deaths
Oklahoma Panhandle State University alumni
University of Oklahoma College of Law alumni
Oklahoma lawyers
State treasurers of Oklahoma
Lieutenant Governors of Oklahoma
20th-century American politicians
20th-century American lawyers
United States Army Air Forces pilots of World War II